Novovarshavsky District is an administrative and municipal district (raion), one of the thirty-two in Omsk Oblast, Russia. It is located in the southeast of the oblast. Its administrative center is the urban locality (a work settlement) of Novovarshavka. Population: 24,450 (2010 Census);  The population of Novovarshavka accounts for 24.1% of the district's total population.

References

Notes

Sources

Districts of Omsk Oblast